Talata Mafara is a Local Government Area in Zamfara State, Nigeria. Its headquarters is in the town of Talata Mafara, about 15 km from the Bakolori Dam on the Sokoto River. The town lies on the southern edge of the major irrigation project fed by the dam.
The town is the birthplace of Yahaya Abdulkarim, governor of Sokoto State from January 1992 to November 1993.

The postal code of the area is 892.

References

Local Government Areas in Zamfara State